DnaJ (Hsp40) homolog, subfamily C, member 13, also known as DNAJC13, is a human gene.

References

Further reading

Heat shock proteins